A Thousand Stars Aglitter is a 1959 West German musical comedy film directed by Harald Philipp and starring Germaine Damar, Toni Sailer and Maria Sebaldt.

Cast
 Germaine Damar as Patricia
 Toni Sailer as Robert Faber
 Maria Sebaldt as Margot
 Harald Juhnke as Axel Grenner Jr.
 Stanislav Ledinek as Direktor Bruchsal
 Alfred Balthoff as Axel Grenner Sr.
 Line Renaud as Juliette
 Chris Howland as Freddy
 Ady Berber as Marko
 Gerd Frickhöffer as Lefebvre, Regisseur
 Werner Fuetterer as Radioreporter
 Erich Dunskus as Direktor Fromme
 Ralf Bendix as Sänger
 Hans Blum as Sänger
 Heinz Schachtner as Trompeter
 Kenneth Spencer as Sänger
 John Schapar
 Rosemarie Renz
 Pia Trajuhn
 Jan Borall
 Anita von Ow
 Franz-Otto Krüger as 1. Gläubiger
 Kurt Waitzmann as 2. Gläubiger
 Ewald Wenck as 3. Gläubiger

References

Bibliography 
Lutz Peter Koepnick. The Cosmopolitan Screen: German Cinema and the Global Imaginary, 1945 to the Present. University of Michigan Press, 2007.

External links 
 

1959 films
West German films
German musical comedy films
1959 musical comedy films
1950s German-language films
Films directed by Harald Philipp
1950s German films